A Salty Dog is the third studio album by English rock band Procol Harum, released in 1969 by record labels Regal Zonophone and A&M.

Content 

A Salty Dog has an ostensibly nautical theme, as indicated by its cover (a pastiche of the famous Player's Navy Cut cigarette pack). Interspersed with straight rock, blues and pop items, A Salty Dog showed a slight change of direction from its predecessors, being thematically less obscure. The title track itself was the first Procol track to use an orchestra, as would be referred to in the live album performance released some three years later.

The album was the first record produced by Matthew Fisher, who quit the band soon after its release. This was also the last Procol Harum album to feature bass guitarist Dave Knights.

Background and recording 

A Salty Dog was recorded in March 1969. The musical tensions between the group and Robin Trower were beginning to show in this album, and although his guitar sound remains integral to most of the tracks, "Crucifiction Lane" (featuring a rare Trower vocal), in retrospect, shows that Trower was already moving in a different direction from the rest of the band. Still, this album is much more musically varied than the two previous albums, with three Fisher vocals and one by Trower. Many of the instruments the band used on A Salty Dog had been previously used on albums by the Beatles and the Shadows.

Release 

A Salty Dog was released in the US in April 1969 by the record label A&M, and June 1969 in the UK by record label Regal Zonophone. The title track, backed with "Long Gone Geek", reached number 44 in the UK Singles Chart in 1969 and the album itself number 27 in the Albums Chart. In Canada, the album reached #25.

Reception 

When Gary Brooker first played Keith Reid's lyrics of Salty Dog on the piano for the benefit of B.J. Wilson, the room was filled with sunlight shining through the windows. Wilson, with a sunbeam on his face, told Brooker he thought "it was the most beautiful song he had ever heard."
John Mendelson, writing for Rolling Stone, called it "a confusing album. At its best it represents the group's greatest success to date with the brand of rock for which the group is known; at its worst it is both surprisingly mediocre and trivial". Robert Christgau was more enthusiastic in The Village Voice, giving it an "A+", although he later said the printed grade was "a mistake" and should have probably been a "B+".

In a retrospective review, Bruce Eder of AllMusic wrote, "This album, the group's third, was where they showed just how far their talents extended across the musical landscape, from blues to R&B to classical rock. In contrast to their hastily recorded debut, or its successor, done to stretch their performance and composition range", calling the title track "one of the finest songs ever to come from Procol Harum and one of the best pieces of progressive rock ever heard".

Track listing

Personnel 
Procol Harum
 Gary Brooker – lead vocals , piano, celeste, three-stringed guitar, bells, harmonica, wood recorder, orchestral arrangements 
 Robin Trower – lead and acoustic guitars, lead vocals , sleigh tambourine
 Matthew Fisher – organ, lead vocals , marimba, rhythm and acoustic guitars, piano, recorder, orchestral arrangements , production
 Dave Knights – bass
 B. J. Wilson – drums, conga drums, tabla
 John "Kellogs" Kalinowski – bosun's whistle, refreshments
 Keith Reid – lyrics

 Technical

 Ken Scott – engineering (1–5, 8–10)
 Ian Stuart - engineering (6)
 Henry Lewy – engineering (7)
 Dickinson – front cover art

References

External links 

 ProcolHarum.com's page on this album

Procol Harum albums
1969 albums
Regal Zonophone Records albums
A&M Records albums
Polydor Records albums
Repertoire Records albums
Albums produced by Matthew Fisher